Li County or Lixian is a county under the jurisdiction of Baoding prefecture-level city, Hebei, China.

Administrative divisions 

 Towns : Liwu, Liushi, Dabaichi, Xinxing, Beiguodan, Wan'an, Sangyuan, Nanzhuang, Li County, Hebei
 Townships : Xiaochen Township, Linbao Township, Beiniantou Township, Baoxu Township, Daquti Township

Climate

Religion 
The Catholic minority is pastorally served by the Apostolic Prefecture of Lixian (Lizhou/ Lichow).

References

Sources and external links
 xzqh.org
 GCatholic

 
Geography of Baoding
County-level divisions of Hebei